Yu-7 or Yu 7 may refer to:

Yu-7 torpedo, a Chinese torpedo
, an Imperial Japanese Army transport submarine of World War II